0° or 0 degrees may refer to:
 Longitude: the prime meridian on any planet or moon
 For most of the 20th century on Earth, the prime meridian (Greenwich)
 IERS Reference Meridian, the modern reference meridian for time and global navigation on Earth
 Latitude: the equator
 freezing point of water (Celsius)
 absolute zero, the lower limit of the thermodynamic temperature scale (Kelvins)
 0° Fahrenheit, approximately -17.78° Celsius

See also 
 0 (disambiguation)